The Massachusetts Bicycle Club (est.1879) was a cycling club in Boston, Massachusetts.

Brief history 

The club was founded on January 10, 1879. "We, the undersigned, hereby agree to organize ourselves into a bicycle club, to be called The Massachusetts Bicycle Club." Founders included Albert A. Pope,  Edward W. Pope,  William G. Fish,  Arthur W. Pope,  Frank W. Freeborn,  George G. Hall,  H.E. Parkhurst,  C.H. Corken,  William H. Ames, Augustus F. Webster,  H. Winslow Warren,  Winfield S. Slocum, William F. Brownell,  Joseph P. Livermore,  and Albert S. Parsons. Membership rose to 70 in 1883; and to 225 members in 1885.

Architect George F. Meacham designed a new headquarters building for the club in 1884, located at 152 Newbury Street in Boston. By 1885, the club had "established a small repair-shop in its wheel-room, with a small assortment of parts and sundries of prominent makes, for the convenience of members."

In May 1883, the club took part in a League of American Wheelman parade on Fifth Avenue in New York City. Members wore uniforms of "dark-blue and white cap." The club organized a "Midwinter Carnival" at the Mechanics' Fair Building in December 1885. "The affair attracted some 3,000 enthusiasts. At 8 in the morning, as a band played, 100 cyclists paraded into the building dressed as devils, counts, revolutionary soldiers. ...A 'bicycle drill squad' and a trick rider wowed the assembly. At 9, Pierre Lallement himself ...appeared on his original 1865 velocipede."

Further reading 
 The Massachusetts Bicycle Club. The Wheelman, v.2, no.3, June 1883.
 Invaded by bicyclists; Asbury Park Wheelmen Give the Visitors a Cordial Welcome... Wheelmen and Wheelwomen Throng the Beautiful City by the Sea to Attend the National Meet of the American League. New York Times, July 9, 1895; p. 2.

References 

Cycling clubs
Clubs and societies in Boston
Sports in Boston
Cycling teams established in 1879
Buildings and structures in Boston
Cultural infrastructure completed in 1884
Back Bay, Boston
19th century in Boston
1879 establishments in Massachusetts
History of cycling
History of cycling in the United States
History of cycling in Massachusetts